Occidodiaptomus kummerloewei is a species of copepod in the family Diaptomidae, which has only been recorded from a pool near Ilgaz, Turkey.

References

Arthropods of Turkey
Diaptomidae
Crustaceans described in 1940
Freshwater crustaceans of Asia
Endemic fauna of Turkey
Taxonomy articles created by Polbot
Taxobox binomials not recognized by IUCN